Battle of Sanaa may refer to:
 Battle of Sanaa (2011), urban fighting between protesters and the Saleh administration
 Battle of Sanaa (2014), the decisive victory of Houthi rebels over the Hadi administration
 Battle of Sanaa (2017), the decisive victory of Houthis over pro-Saleh fighters

See also 
 Battle of Aden (disambiguation)